Sodium peroxide is an inorganic compound with the formula Na2O2. This yellowish solid is the  product of sodium ignited in excess oxygen. It is a strong base. This metal peroxide exists in several hydrates and peroxyhydrates including Na2O2·2H2O2·4H2O, Na2O2·2H2O, Na2O2·2H2O2, and Na2O2·8H2O. The octahydrate, which is simple to prepare, is white, in contrast to the anhydrous material.

Properties
Sodium peroxide crystallizes with hexagonal symmetry. Upon heating, the hexagonal form undergoes a transition into a phase of unknown symmetry at 512 °C.  With further heating above the 657 °C boiling point, the compound decomposes to Na2O, releasing O2.
 2 Na2O2  →   2 Na2O   +   O2

Preparation
The octahydrate is produced by treating sodium hydroxide with hydrogen peroxide.

Sodium peroxide can be prepared on a large scale by the reaction of metallic sodium with oxygen at 130–200 °C, a process that generates sodium oxide, which in a separate stage absorbs oxygen:
 4 Na  +  O2  →   2 Na2O
 2 Na2O  +  O2  →   2 Na2O2

It may also be produced by passing ozone gas over solid sodium iodide inside a platinum or palladium tube. The ozone oxidizes the sodium to form sodium peroxide. The iodine can be sublimed by mild heating. The platinum or palladium catalyzes the reaction and is not attacked by the sodium peroxide.

Uses
Sodium peroxide hydrolyzes to give sodium hydroxide and hydrogen peroxide according to the reaction
 Na2O2 + 2 H2O → 2 NaOH + H2O2

Sodium peroxide was used to bleach wood pulp for the production of paper and textiles.  Presently it is mainly used for specialized laboratory operations, e.g., the extraction of minerals from various ores.  Sodium peroxide may go by the commercial names of Solozone and Flocool. In chemistry preparations, sodium peroxide is used as an oxidizing agent. It is also used as an oxygen source by reacting it with carbon dioxide to produce oxygen and sodium carbonate:
 2 Na2O2 + 2 CO2 → 2 Na2CO3 + O2
It is thus particularly useful in scuba gear, submarines, etc. Lithium peroxide and potassium superoxide have similar uses.

References

External links
International Chemical Safety Card 1606

Peroxides
Sodium compounds
Oxidizing agents